Vijeta is a 2020 Indian Marathi language, sports drama film directed by Amol Shetge and produced by Rahul Puri under the banner of Subhash Ghai's Mukta Arts with Suresh Pai as co-producer. The film starring Subodh Bhave, Sushant Shelar and Pooja Sawant follows the story of a sport coach Soumitra and his athletes teammates, who are all set to win gold for Maharashtra. Subodh encourages them to focus more on their mental strength rather than physical.

In the inaugural ceremony of the 12th Goa Marathi Film Festival in June 2019, the presenter of the film, Subhash Ghai announced the film by unveiling the first look poster. The principal photography began in August 2019. The film was theatrically released on 12 March 2020.

Cast
 Subodh Bhave as Soumitra Deshmukh (mind coach)
 Sushant Shelar as Bhatkal (head coach)
 Pooja Sawant as Nalini Jagtap (Triathlon)
 Pritam Kagne as Sunanda Gujjar (runner)
 Manasi Kulkarni as Varsha Kanbinde (Dean)
 Maadhav Deochake as Rahul Thorat (weight lifter)
 Devendra Chougule
 Tanvi Kishore as Sonia Karnik (Boxer)
 Dipti Dhotre
 Krutika Tulaskar 
 Gaurish Shipurkar

Release

The film was released on 12 March 2020.

Soundtrack

Soundtrack of the film was composed by Rohan Rohan whereas lyrics were penned by Manndar Cholkar, Amol Shetge and Mandar Satpute

References

External links
 

2020 films
2020s sports drama films
2020s Marathi-language films
Indian sports drama films
Films scored by Rohan-Rohan
2020 drama films
Films directed by Amol Shetge